The Ravan Baku 2012-13 season was Ravan Baku's second Azerbaijan Premier League season. Ravan started the season under new manager Cevat Güler, having replaced Bahman Hasanov in preseason. Güler was sacked as manager on 25 August with Hasanov being brought in as caretaker manager until Ravan appointed Kemal Alispahić on 24 September. Alispahić himself was sacked on 21 December 2012, after 4 wins in 13 games, and was replaced by Ramil Aliyev. Ravan went on to finish 8th in the league. They also participate in the 2012–13 Azerbaijan Cup, reaching the Quarterfinals, where they went out 6-2 on aggregate to Khazar Lankaran.

Squad
Transfers
Summer

In:

 

 

 

 
 

Out:

Winter

In:

 

 

Out:

 

 
 

Competitions
Friendlies

Azerbaijan Premier League

Results summary

Results by round

Results

League table

Notes
Note 1: Simurq were awarded a 3-0 victory after Ravan Baku fielded 8 foreigners during the game instead of the maximum 7.

Azerbaijan Premier League Relegation Group
Results summary

Results by round

Results

Table

Azerbaijan Cup

Squad statistics

Appearances and goals

|-
|colspan="14"|Players who appeared for Raven Baku no longer at the club:''

|}

Goal scorers

Disciplinary record

References

External links 
 Ravan Baku at Soccerway.com

Ravan Baku
Ravan Baku FC seasons